Chris Mills or Christopher Mills may refer to:

Geography
Christopher Mills, New Jersey, an unincorporated community

People
Christopher Mills (director), a Canadian filmmaker.
Chris Mills (basketball), American basketball player
Chris Mills (musician)
Christopher Mills, 3rd Viscount Mills 
Christopher Mills (Killer7), video game character
Chris Mills (speedway rider) (born 1983), British speedway rider